The ISCB Accomplishment by a Senior Scientist Award is an annual prize awarded by the International Society for Computational Biology for contributions to the field of computational biology.

Laureates
2021 - Peer Bork
2020 - Steven Salzberg
2019 - Bonnie Berger
2018 - Ruth Nussinov
2017 - Pavel Pevzner
2016 - Søren Brunak
2015 - Cyrus Chothia
2014 - Gene Myers 
2013 - David Eisenberg
2012 - Gunnar von Heijne
2011 - Michael Ashburner
2010 - Chris Sander
2009 - Webb Miller
2008 - David Haussler
2007 - Temple F. Smith
2006 - Michael Waterman
2005 - Janet Thornton
2004 - David J. Lipman
2003 - David Sankoff

References

Bioinformatics